Nery Andrés Domínguez (born 9 April 1990) is an Argentine footballer who plays for Chilean Primera División side Universidad de Chile as a defender.

Career
After being loaned during 2018 from Querétaro, Domínguez permanently joined Racing Club since 2019.

On 1 July 2022, Domínguez joined Chilean Primera División side Universidad de Chile on a deal for 18 months.

Honours
Rosario Central
Primera B Nacional (1): 2012–13

Querétaro
Copa MX (1): Apertura 2016

Independiente
Copa Sudamericana (1): 2017

Racing Club
Argentine Primera División (1): 2018–19
Trofeo de Campeones (1): 2019

References

External links
 

1990 births
Living people
Sportspeople from Santa Fe Province
Argentine footballers
Argentine expatriate footballers
Argentine Primera División players
Primera Nacional players
Liga MX players
Chilean Primera División players
Rosario Central footballers
Querétaro F.C. footballers
Club Atlético Independiente footballers
Racing Club de Avellaneda footballers
Universidad de Chile footballers
Argentine expatriate sportspeople in Mexico
Expatriate footballers in Mexico
Argentine expatriate sportspeople in Chile
Expatriate footballers in Chile
Association football midfielders